Llanfihangel (English: St Michael's Church) can refer to the following places in Wales:

Llanfihangel (Powys electoral ward), including Llanfihangel-yng-Ngwynfa
Llanfihangel Aberbythych, Carmarthenshire
Llanfihangel Bachellaeth, Gwynedd
Llanfihangel y Creuddyn, Ceredigion
Llanfihangel-ar-Arth, Carmarthenshire
Llanfihangel Crucorney, Monmouthshire
Llanfihangel Genau'r Glyn, the former name for Llandre, Ceredigion
Llanfihangel Glyn Myfyr, Conwy
Llantarnam (Welsh: Llanfihangel Llantarnam), Torfaen
Llanfihangel Nant Brân, Powys
Llanfihangel Nant Melan, Powys
Llanfihangel Penbedw, a former parish in the Hundred of Kilgerran, Pembrokeshire
Llanfihangel Rhos-y-Corn, Carmarthenshire
Llanfihangel Rhydithon, Powys
Llanfihangel Talyllyn, Powys 
Llanfihangel Tor-y-Mynydd, Monmouthshire
Llanfihangel Tre'r Beirdd, on the Isle of Anglesey
Llanfihangel-y-Pennant, a community in Gwynedd
Llanfihangel-y-Pennant, Dolbenmaen, a village in the community of Dolbenmaen, Gwynedd
Llanfihangel-y-Rug is nowadays called Llanrug
Llanfihangel-y-traethau, a church near the village of Ynys, Gwynedd
Llanfihangel-yng-Ngwynfa, Powys
Llanfihangel Ysgeifiog, Isle of Anglesey